Scott Dempsey Morrow (born November 1, 2002) is an American ice hockey defenceman for the University of Massachusetts. He was drafted in the second round, 40th overall, by the Carolina Hurricanes in the 2021 NHL Entry Draft.

Playing career

Collegiate
Morrow began his collegiate career for Massachusetts during the 2021–22 season. During his freshman year he recorded 13 goals and 20 assists in 37 games. He was the first freshman in UMass program history to reach 30 points in a season. In January 2022, he recorded four goals and five assists in eight games. His nine points ranked second among rookie defensemen during the month, and was subsequently named the Hockey East Rookie of the Month. He ranked second among rookie defensemen in goals (13) and points (33), third in points per-game (.892), and fifth in assists (20). Among all defensemen nationally, he ranked eighth in points per-game, tied for fourth in goals and fifth in points. Following an outstanding season he was a unanimous selection to the All-Hockey East Rookie Team and All-Hockey East All-Hockey East First Team. He was also named an AHCA East First Team All-American.

International play
On December 14, 2021, Morrow was named to the Team USA's roster for the 2022 World Junior Ice Hockey Championships.

Personal life
Morrow is the nephew of retired professional ice hockey player Scott Morrow.

Career statistics

Awards and honors

References

External links
 

2002 births
Living people
AHCA Division I men's ice hockey All-Americans
Carolina Hurricanes draft picks
Fargo Force players
Ice hockey people from Connecticut
People from Stamford, Connecticut
UMass Minutemen ice hockey players
Youngstown Phantoms players